Eremophila setacea is a flowering plant in the figwort family, Scrophulariaceae and is endemic to Western Australia. It is an erect shrub with narrow, glabrous leaves, hairy sepals and light blue to purple petals.

Description
Its leaves are linear, flat, tapering and usually have a few irregular teeth on their edges.

The edges and outer two-thirds of the sepal surface is covered with long, white hairs while the inner surface is covered with glandular hairs. The petal tube is light blue to purple, sometimes white on the outside and white streaked brown or reddish-brown inside. The petal tube and its lobes are hairy on the outside and glabrous inside apart from woolly hairs inside the tube and parts of the lobes. The 4 stamens are enclosed in the petal tube.

Taxonomy and naming 
Eremophila setacea was first formally described by Robert Chinnock in 2007 and the description was published in Eremophila and Allied Genera: A Monograph of the Plant Family Myoporaceae. The specific epithet (setacea) is derived from the Latin word seta meaning "bristle", referring to the hairs on the flower stalk and sepals.

Distribution and habitat 
This eremophila grows in red sand and soils derived from limestone between Carnarvon and Exmouth in the Carnarvon and Yalgoo biogeographic regions.

Conservation
Eremophila setacea is classified "not threatened" by the Western Australian Government Department of Parks and Wildlife.

Use in horticulture
This eremophila is very fast-growing but can also be short-lived. It can produce massed displays of pale lilac-coloured flowers and is worthy of being planted in a group. It can be propagated by grafting onto Myoporum rootstock and grown in well-drained soil in a sunny position. It is drought tolerant, requiring only an occasional watering during long dry spells. It can be damaged by severe frosts but will usually recover if the affected leaves are pruned.

References

setacea
Eudicots of Western Australia
Endemic flora of Western Australia
Plants described in 2007
Taxa named by Robert Chinnock